Jan Hendrikus Cornelis van Zanen (born 4 September 1961) is a Dutch politician who has served as Mayor of The Hague since 1 July 2020. A member of the People's Party for Freedom and Democracy (VVD), he previously served as Mayor of Utrecht (2014–2020) and Amstelveen (2005–2013). Jan van Zanen also was national chairman of the VVD (2003–2008). He has been president of the Association of Netherlands Municipalities (VNG) since 3 June 2015.

Career
Van Zanen grew up in Edam-Volendam and was the national vice president of the Youth Organisation Freedom and Democracy (JOVD). He studied law at VU Amsterdam and at Cornell Law School of Cornell University in Ithaca (New York). Van Zanen completed his military service as a reserve officer with the Royal Netherlands Air Force. From 1991 to 1998, he served as the secretary of the executive board of the national entrepreneurs association, VOG. He represented the VVD in the municipal council of Utrecht from 1990 to 2002. Van Zanen was deputy mayor of public space, finance and economic affairs in Utrecht from 1998 to 2005, and the mayor of Amstelveen from 2005 to 2013.

He was also chairperson of the VVD (2003-2008), as the successor to Bas Eenhoorn. In 1994, Van Zanen wrote a biography about a former VVD chairperson, Haya van Someren-Downer: Haya, vrouw voor vrijheid en democratie. [Haya, woman for freedom and democracy] In 1996, Van Zanen won the Thorbecke Award for political eloquence. On leaving his position as deputy mayor, on 23 June 2005 he was presented with the Silver City Medal of Utrecht. When he resigned as chairperson of the VVD on 23 May 2008, he was presented with the Thorbecke medal by his successor Ivo Opstelten. Following his departure as Mayor of Amstelveen on 20 December 2013, Van Zanen became an honorary citizen of this municipality. On 28 March 2015, the general assembly of the JOVD nominated Van Zanen as honorary member.

Mayor of Utrecht 
From 1 January 2014 to 1 July 2020, he was the 330th mayor of Utrecht. On 3 June 2015, the members of the Association of Netherlands Municipalities (VNG) chose Van Zanen as its new president. In this framework, since 15 November 2019, he has been co-president of the UCLG and executive president of the CEMR. On 18 June 2015, Marcel Guinchard, president of the French Chamber of Commerce, and the French ambassador Laurent Pic presented Van Zanen with the 'Prix de la Personnalité de l'Année 2015'. On 27 May 2016, Japanese ambassador Hiroshi Inomata presented him with an imperial award in the order of the Rising Sun, Golden Rays with Cravatte for his 'exceptional contribution to promoting the relationship and cultural and economic relations between the Netherlands and Japan'.

On 15 November 2016, the French ambassador Philippe Lalliot presented him with the medals associated with the National Order of the Legion of Honour. Van Zanen was decorated for his contribution to relations between France and the Netherlands. This particularly related to his involvement in the Grand Départ of the Tour de France in Utrecht, as well as his role in launching the French-Netherlands economic year in the summer of 2015. On 8 November 2017, he took sick leave following his diagnosis of malignant prostate cancer at the beginning of September of that year. On 30 December 2017, he resumed his work as mayor.

On 8 June 2018, Van Zanen received the Clear Language Award in the category of clearest mayor of the Netherlands. This award is an initiative of the VU Language Centre and is presented annually to a well-known Dutch national with exceptional language skills. On 12 April 2019, governor Bauke Boersma from Rotary International presented Van Zanen with the medals associated with the honorary title Paul Harris Fellow of The Rotary Foundation. '... To reflect our appreciation for the real and meaningful contribution to promoting international relations and friendship between all nations of the world ...'. On 18 July 2019, the municipal council proposed that Van Zanen should be reappointed as mayor. His reappointment formally started on 7 January 2020. On that occasion, he referred to Utrecht as "The city of my dreams". On his retirement as Mayor of Utrecht on 30 June 2020, Van Zanen received the golden city medal.

Mayor of The Hague 
On 1 July 2020, Van Zanen was appointed Mayor of The Hague. On 11 October 2020, during the Utrecht Rainbow Festival, he was presented with the Annie Brouwer-Korf Award 2020 for his contribution to the acceptance and visibility of the LGBTI+-community.  On 24 October 2021, the Spanish ambassador María Jesús Alonso Jiménez presented Van Zanen on behalf of King Felipe VI the Orden de Isabel la Católica in the rank of Commander (Encomienda). Van Zanen was decorated for his contribution to the relations between Spain and the Netherlands.

Personal life 
Van Zanen has two children.

References

External links

Official
  Mr. J.H.C. (Jan) van Zanen Parlement & Politiek

 

1961 births
Living people
Aldermen of Utrecht
Chairmen of the People's Party for Freedom and Democracy
Cornell Law School alumni
Dutch expatriates in the United States
Dutch trade association executives
Mayors of Amstelveen
Mayors of The Hague
Mayors of Utrecht
Municipal councillors of Utrecht (city)
People from Edam-Volendam
People from Purmerend
People's Party for Freedom and Democracy politicians
Royal Netherlands Air Force officers
Vrije Universiteit Amsterdam alumni
20th-century Dutch civil servants
20th-century Dutch jurists
20th-century Dutch military personnel
20th-century Dutch politicians
21st-century Dutch civil servants
21st-century Dutch jurists
21st-century Dutch politicians